Durfee  is a stream in Cook County, Minnesota, in the United States.

Durfee Creek was named for George H. Durfee, a county judge.

See also
List of rivers of Minnesota

References

Rivers of Cook County, Minnesota
Rivers of Minnesota